Scotiellopsis terrestris is an algae species in the genus Scotiellopsis.

References

External links

Sphaeropleales